The Cooper T57 (Type 57), also known as the Cooper T57 Monaco, or the Cooper Monaco T57, is a sports racing car, designed, developed and built by British manufacturer Cooper, in 1960, and was constructed as the successor model to the T49. It competed in motor racing between 1961 and 1965, and won a total of 26 races (plus 6 additional class wins), scored 43 podium finishes, and clinched 3 pole positions.

References

Cooper racing cars
Sports racing cars
1960s cars
Cars of England